Pseudodiadematidae are members of the phylum Echinodermata. Their fossil remains date to the Cretaceous period (144 - 66.4 MYA). Its child geniuses are Acanthechinopsis, Acrocidaris, Acrotiaris and Aplodiadema.

External links
echinologia.com

Echinoidea